In the terminology of quantum field theory, a ghost, ghost field, ghost particle, or gauge ghost is an unphysical state in a gauge theory. Ghosts are necessary to keep gauge invariance in theories where the local fields exceed a number of physical degrees of freedom.

If a given theory is self-consistent by the introduction of ghosts, these states are labeled "good". Good ghosts are virtual particles that are introduced for regularization, like Faddeev–Popov ghosts. Otherwise, "bad" ghosts admit undesired non-virtual states in a theory, like Pauli–Villars ghosts that introduce particles with negative kinetic energy.

An example of the need of ghost fields is the photon, which is usually described by a four component vector potential , even if light has only two allowed polarizations in the vacuum. To remove the unphysical degrees of freedom, it is necessary to enforce some restrictions, one way to do this reduction is to introduce some ghost field in the theory. While it is not always necessary to add ghosts to quantize the electromagnetic field, ghost fields are strictly needed when dealing with non-Abelian Yang–Mills theory extensions to the Standard Model.

A field with a negative ghost number (the number of ghosts excitations in the field) is called an anti-ghost.

Good ghosts

Faddeev–Popov ghosts

Faddeev–Popov ghosts are extraneous anticommuting fields which are introduced to maintain the consistency of the path integral formulation. They are named after Ludvig Faddeev and Victor Popov.

Goldstone bosons 
Goldstone bosons are sometimes referred to as ghosts. Mainly, when speaking about the vanishing bosons of the spontaneous symmetry breaking of the electroweak symmetry through the Higgs mechanism. These good ghosts are artifacts of gauge fixing. The longitudinal polarization components of the W and Z bosons correspond to the Goldstone bosons of the spontaneously broken part of the electroweak symmetry SU(2)⊗U(1), which, however, are not observable. Because this symmetry is gauged, the three would-be Goldstone bosons, or ghosts, are "eaten" by the three gauge bosons (W± and Z) corresponding to the three broken generators; this gives these three gauge bosons a mass, and the associated necessary third polarization degree of freedom.

Bad ghosts 
"Bad ghosts" represent another, more general meaning of the word "ghost" in theoretical physics: states of negative norm, or fields with the wrong sign of the kinetic term, such as Pauli–Villars ghosts, whose existence allows the probabilities to be negative thus violating unitarity.

Ghost particles could obtain the symmetry or break it in gauge fields. The "good ghost" particles actually obtain the symmetry by unchanging the "gauge fixing Lagrangian" in a gauge transformation, while bad ghost particles break the symmetry by bringing in the non-abelian G-matrix which does change the symmetry, and this was the main reason to introduce the gauge covariant and contravariant derivatives.

Ghost condensate 

A ghost condensate is a speculative proposal in which a ghost, an excitation of a field with a wrong sign of the kinetic term, acquires a vacuum expectation value. This phenomenon breaks Lorentz invariance spontaneously. Around the new vacuum state, all excitations have a positive norm, and therefore the probabilities are positive definite.

We have a real scalar field φ with the following action

where a and b are positive constants and

using the sign convention in the (+, −, −, −) metric signature.

The theories of ghost condensate predict specific non-Gaussianities of the cosmic microwave background. These theories have been proposed by Nima Arkani-Hamed, Markus Luty, and others.

Unfortunately, this theory allows for superluminal propagation of information in some cases and has no lower bound on its energy. This model doesn't admit a Hamiltonian formulation (the Legendre transform is multi-valued because the momentum function isn't convex) because it is acausal. Quantizing this theory leads to problems.

Landau ghost 

The Landau pole is sometimes referred as the Landau ghost. Named after Lev Landau, this ghost is an inconsistency in the renormalization procedure in which there is no asymptotic freedom at large energy scales.

See also
No-ghost theorem, related to bad ghosts
BRST quantization, scheme to deal with ghosts

References

External links
 

Quantum field theory